The following contains a list of episodes from the American animated television series A Pup Named Scooby-Doo which ran on ABC from 1988 until 1991. This is the eighth incarnation of the long running Scooby-Doo Saturday morning series following the "Scooby-Doo Detective Agency's" adventures as adolescents.

Series overview

Episodes

Season 1 (1988)
The only season of the series to use digital ink and paint. With thirteen episodes, this is the series' longest season to date.

Season 2 (1989)
From Season 2 onward, the series used traditional cel animation.

Season 3 (1990)

Season 4 (1991)

Notes
 From January to July, 1991, the ABC Weekend Special replaced A Pup Named Scooby-Doo on ABC's Saturday morning lineup. The final three first-run episodes were not run until August, 1991.
 When released on DVD in complete season sets, A Pup Named Scooby-Doo: The Complete 1st Season contained all thirteen episodes from the first season, while the final season was split into two to make A Pup Named Scooby-Doo: The Complete 2nd, 3rd, & 4th Seasons on the second complete season set. Episodes that had more than one story-line in them were also considered to be separate episodes, totalling 30 episodes.

References

Lists of Scooby-Doo television series episodes
Lists of American children's animated television series episodes